The Colonnades Leisure Park (also known as Croydon Colonnades) is an out-of-town leisure park located in the Purley Way retail and industrial district of the London Borough of Croydon, South London. It opened in the late 1990s on the former site of the Croydon Water Palace, an indoor water park complex that operated from 1990 to 1996. It lies alongside the Purley Way Playing Fields, and opposite the former Croydon Airport site.

The site is currently owned and operated by Croydon Council who finally completed the purchase in August 2019 at a cost of more than £50m.

Tenants
The Colonnades competes with the nearby Valley Park Retail Area, a main commercial area on Purley Way, but is less busy due to the lack of a notable anchor tenant - Valley Park has IKEA, while the Purley Way Centre has Sainsbury's. Although The Colonnades centres itself as more of an entertainment complex than shopping area. The retail park is the southernmost of the three on the A23 Purley Way, and is close to Purley town centre.

Former tenants
Most of the original outlets in the park were entertainment oriented, including City Limits, an indoor entertainment centre with a restaurant, sports bar, arcade and bowling facilities. The City Limits complex closed following the termination of their lease by owner Punch Taverns.

Other original tenants included Gipsy Moth (a family pub), the food court which used to house Subway, BBQ Xpress, China Wok and Karahi Cuisine. The Gipsy Moth site was demolished in 2018 to make way for a new multi-outlet retail unit, and in early 2019 McDonald's and Nando's were confirmed as tenants of two of the units.

Present-day tenants
In 2010 it was announced that the retail park would include the first drive-through Costa Coffee outlet. This opened in 2015.

On 2 October 2019 the complex said plans to open a new KFC restaurant, occupied in the 3 restaurants in the second unit.  This opened in late October 2019.

Current tenants of the site include Pizza Hut, McDonald's, Premier Inn, Nando's, a Kidspace indoor adventure playground, Oxygen free jumping, and a Nuffield Health & Fitness Centre. T.G.I. Friday's has a restaurant located across the road from the retail area, as well as a Hilton Hotel.

References

External links 
Nandos The Colonnades
Pizza Hut The Colonnades
McDonald's The Colonnades
Kidspace Adventures Croydon
Nuffield Health & Fitness Croydon
Premier Inn London Croydon (Purley A23)

Leisure in the London Borough of Croydon
Tourist attractions in the London Borough of Croydon
Buildings and structures in the London Borough of Croydon
Retail parks in the United Kingdom